Arnaud Gérard (born 6 October 1984 in Dinan, Côtes-d'Armor) is a French former professional road bicycle racer, who rode professionally between 2005 and 2018 for the  and  teams. The cousin of former professional cyclist Cédric Hervé, Gérard now works as a directeur sportif for the  team.

Major results

2002
 1st  Road race, UCI Junior Road World Championships
 1st  Road race, National Junior Road Championships
2003
 1st Stage 1 Bidasoa Itzulia
2004
 3rd La Roue Tourangelle
2006
 9th Polynormande
2007
 8th Overall Paris–Corrèze
 9th Grand Prix de la Somme
 10th GP Ouest–France
2008
 1st Polynormande
 6th GP Ouest–France
 10th Omloop Het Volk
  Combativity award Stage 12 Tour de France
2009
 5th Grand Prix de Plumelec-Morbihan
2010
 6th Overall Étoile de Bessèges
2011
 3rd Polynormande
 6th GP Ouest–France
 10th Paris–Tours
2012
 8th Grand Prix de Plumelec-Morbihan
2013
 4th Overall Tour du Poitou-Charentes
 7th Route Adélie
 8th Overall Tour du Limousin
2014
 2nd Duo Normand (with Anthony Delaplace)
 4th Overall Boucles de la Mayenne
 6th Overall Circuit de la Sarthe
 7th Classic Loire Atlantique
 8th Overall Tour du Poitou-Charentes
 10th Coppa Bernocchi
2015
 1st Stage 1 Tour du Poitou-Charentes
 10th Classic Sud-Ardèche
2016
 8th Duo Normand (with Anthony Delaplace)
2017
 2nd Overall Ronde de l'Oise

References

External links 

1984 births
Living people
People from Dinan
French male cyclists
Sportspeople from Côtes-d'Armor
Cyclists from Brittany